Paul Van Asbroeck (1 May 1874 – 1959) was a Belgian sport shooter who competed in the early 20th century in rifle and pistol shooting. He competed at the 1900 Olympics in Paris and won a bronze medal in the military rifle 3 positions category. However the medal was tied with Norwegian Ole Ostmo.

In the 1908 Olympics in London he won the Free pistol event and took silver in the team event. He also won the individual World Championships in that event in 1904, 1907, 1909, 1910, 1912, and 1914.

He also competed in the 1920, 1924, and 1936 Olympic Games, for a total of five Olympic appearances. The document 'Five Or More Appearances in the Olympics, 1992 Revision' by the Olympic historians Lennart Dahllöf, Wolf Lyberg, and Dr Bill Mallon claims that Van Asbroeck appeared in six Olympic Games, citing '1906-08, 20-28, 36', but this appears to be in error. Presumably the 1906 is a typo for 1900, since he did compete in 1906. The 1906 Intercalated Games do not count as 'official' Olympics, while shooting was not part of the Olympic programme in 1904 or 1928.

Olympic results

References

External links
 
Profile

1874 births
1959 deaths
Belgian male sport shooters
ISSF rifle shooters
ISSF pistol shooters
Olympic shooters of Belgium
Shooters at the 1900 Summer Olympics
Shooters at the 1908 Summer Olympics
Shooters at the 1920 Summer Olympics
Shooters at the 1924 Summer Olympics
Shooters at the 1936 Summer Olympics
Olympic gold medalists for Belgium
Olympic silver medalists for Belgium
Olympic bronze medalists for Belgium
Date of death missing
Olympic medalists in shooting
Medalists at the 1900 Summer Olympics
Medalists at the 1908 Summer Olympics
People from Schaerbeek
Place of death missing